Huso is a genus of large sturgeons from Eurasia. It contains two species, both of which are critically endangered:

Huso dauricus (Georgi, 1775) (kaluga)
Huso huso (Linnaeus, 1758) (beluga)

Recent data indicate a polyphyletic origin of the genus Huso, and it is suggested that the two Huso species should be included in the genus Acipenser.

References 

Sturgeons
Extant Zanclean first appearances
Ray-finned fish genera